The Diocese of Feldkirch is a Latin Church diocese located in the city of Feldkirch, Vorarlberg, in the Ecclesiastical province of Salzburg in Austria.

History
 until the 19th century: part of the Swabian Dioceses of the Catholic Church: Constance, Augsburg
 then attached to the (Tyrolean and thus Austrian) Diocese of Brixen after the split-up of the Holy Roman Empire
 came with the Austrian part of Brixen to the Apostolic Administrature (1921), later (1964) Diocese of Innsbruck-Feldkirch
 8 December 1968: detached from Innsbruck and established as Diocese of Feldkirch

Special churches
Minor Basilicas:
 Liebfrauenbasilika Rankweil, Rankweil, Vorarlberg

Bishops of Feldkirch 
 Bruno Wechner (9 December 1968 – 21 January 1989)
 Klaus Küng (21 January 1989 – 7 October 2004)
 Elmar Fischer (24 May 2005 – 15 November 2011)
 Benno Elbs (since 8 May 2013)

See also
Roman Catholicism in Austria

References

External links
 GCatholic.org 
 Catholic Hierarchy 
  Diocese website

Roman Catholic dioceses in Austria
Christian organizations established in 1968
Roman Catholic dioceses and prelatures established in the 20th century
Feldkirch, Roman Catholic Diocese of